Raymond "Ray" G. Wardingley is an American perennial candidate who has many times, unsuccessfully, sought office in Chicago, Illinois. He is most famous for having been the Republican nominee in the 1995 Chicago mayoral election, and for having previously performed as a clown under the name "Spanky the Clown".

The embarrassment that many in the Republican party felt about Wardingley having been their party's 1995 standard-bearer in the Chicago mayoral election has been cited as a reason that a Republican-led Illinois General Assembly and Republican governor passed into law legislation that made all subsequent Chicago mayoral elections nonpartisan.

Early life
Wardingley was born at Cook County Hospital on February 13, 1935, to Albert and Thelma Wardingley. He was the sixth child born of ten children. His family lived on the Southeast Side of Chicago and were poor. After his parents separated, he and a number of his siblings were sent to catholic orphanages. He attended Mendel and Chicago Vocational High Schools, but did not graduate high school. He later obtained a high school diploma. He later attended Goodman Theatre School.

Career
Per his official biography, Wardingley enlisted in the United States Air Force in 1955 at age 20, but was given a medical discharge two years later, in 1957, after an eardrum was injured in an accident.

Wardingley worked numerous jobs, including taxi and limousine driver, a taxi dispatcher, steel mill worker, stagehand at movie studios in California, a motion picture extra, as well as an actor in commercials. Wardingley also performed as a part-time clown under the name "Spanky the Clown", a fact which attracted attention during his later turn as the Republican Party's Chicago mayoral nominee. He sometimes performed as Spanky the Clown at Chicago Sting games. He also would sometimes fill-in at their games as their mascot Stanley Sting. He created Spanky the Clown to entertain children with cancer at St. Jude Children's Research Hospital. 
He also performed as Spanky the Clown to raise money for St. Jude and other causes. During his 1979 Republican mayoral primary campaign, he performed as Spanky the Clown to raise money for St. Jude Children's Research Hospital. By the time of his 1995 mayoral campaign, he had retired from clowning.

Wardingley managed his local neighborhood watch from 1989 to 1995.

Political career
Wardingley has been a perennial candidate. He has never been elected to any of the numerous offices he has sought.

Wardingley co-founded the Coalition for Restoring Social Standards (C.R.O.S.S.).

Since 2005, he has been a member of the Illinois Right Coalition.

In 2004, Warringley launched an effort to try and persuade Cardinal Francis George to excommunicate Chicago mayor Richard M. Daley, after Daley publicly supported same-sex marriage.

Politically, he has identified himself as a Reagan Republican in the past.

Mayoral campaigns
Wardingley unsuccessfully ran in the Republican primary elections for the 1979, 1983, 1987. In 1983, he failed to get on the ballot due to issues with his ballot petition. He also once ran as a write-in in a general election, garnering only a single vote.

In 1995 Wardingley narrowly won the Republican primary, thereby becoming the party's nominee for mayor of Chicago. The Republican field in the primary was regarded as weak. This was Wardingley's fourth mayoral campaign. However, his victory in the primary was nonetheless considered surprising. His platform included abolishing the Chicago Board of Education, eliminating the employment-based head tax, eliminating desegregation busing, and eliminating bilingual education. He supported school prayer, making inspections of nursing homes stricter, firing many government officials and replacing them with "senior citizens, disabled veterans, Americans, at $10,000 a year." Wardingley also supported increasing the number of veterans' parades. He spoke about wanting to sentence "drug pushers" to life imprisonment and possibly castration or death by hanging. Wardingley characterized himself as someone capable of relating to working class voters, and hoped that by running he would help keep a two-party system alive in a city so dominated by Democrats. Wardingley's candidacy was not taken seriously by many. Many Republicans stayed silent on the mayoral race, rather than endorsing, and a few even went as far as endorsing Democratic incumbent Richard M. Daley over Wardingley. His campaign manager was Ted Lauterbach. The fact he had performed as a clown garnered great attention. He ultimately only garnered 2.77% of the vote in the general election.

Wardingley's mayoral nomination was seen as an embarrassment for the local Republican Party. This has been viewed as the impetus for state Republicans leading the charge to reform Chicago's mayoral election system from a partisan election to a nonpartisan election. This was passed by the then-Republican controlled Illinois Senate and Illinois House of Representatives and signed by Republican governor Jim Edgar later in 1995.

1999 aldermanic campaign
In 1999, Wardingley ran against incumbent Chicago alderman Ginger Rugai for her 19th Ward seat on the Chicago City Council.

U.S. congressional campaigns
Warringley ran in 2000 for Illinois's 1st congressional district, winning the Republican nomination unopposed. He lost to incumbent Democrat Bobby Rush, who garnered 87.8% of the vote to Wardingley's 12.2%. He again ran as the Republican nominee against Rush in Illinois's 1st congressional district in 2002 and 2004. During his 2002 campaign he signed the Americans for Tax Reform's Taxpayer Protection Pledge.

In 2006 he ran as the Republican nominee against incumbent Democrat Dan Lipinski in Illinois's 3rd congressional district. In 2006, Republican leadership expressed embarrassment that the only two candidates running in the Republican primary were Wardingley and white supremacist perennial candidate Arthur J. Jones. On the campaign trail that year, Wardingley refused to shake hands with Jones, saying, "I won't shake the hand that represents the same thing Hitler represented".

Wardingley again ran for Illinois's 1st congressional district as the Republican nominee in 2010. He tried to run again for the 1st congressional district in 2012, but was removed from the ballot.

As a candidate, Wardingley has expressed support for a "FairTax".

2008 state senate campaign
In 2008, he ran against Emil Jones III for the 14th district Illinois Senate seat. The district was heavily Democratic. Wardingly lost by a large margin.

Originally, Emil Jones Jr. was his Democratic opponent, but Jones opted to retire and withdraw from the race, and his son was selected to replace him on the ballot.

Personal life
Wardingley is married to his wife Karen.

Wardingley is a Roman Catholic. , he was living in the Morgan Park neighborhood of Chicago.

Wardingley is a second degree freemason. In 2001, Wardingley became a member of Veterans of Foreign Wars. Wardingley has also been a member of the American Legion since 2001.

References

1935 births
Living people
Illinois Republicans
Politicians from Chicago
American clowns
Male actors from Chicago
Catholics from Illinois
United States Air Force airmen
Military personnel from Illinois